Richmond is an inner-city suburb in Melbourne, Victoria, Australia,  east of Melbourne's Central Business District, located within the City of Yarra local government area. Richmond recorded a population of 28,587 at the 2021 census, with a median age of 34.

A.W.Howitt recorded the Kulin/Woiwurrung name for Richmond as Quo-yung with the possible meaning of 'dead trees'.

Three of the 82 designated major activity centres identified in the Melbourne 2030 Metropolitan Strategy are located in Richmond—the commercial strips of Victoria Street, Bridge Road and Swan Street.

The diverse suburb has been the subject of gentrification since the early 1990s and now contains an eclectic mix of expensively converted warehouse residences, public housing high-rise flats and terrace houses from the Victorian-era. The residential segment of the suburb exists among a lively retail sector. Richmond was home to the Nine Network studios, under the callsign of GTV-9, until the studios moved to Docklands in 2011. Dimmeys is long associated with Richmond, although it is located in the neighbouring suburb of Cremorne. The suburb is well known for its popular factory outlets along Bridge Road, remaining an attraction to the area.

Richmond is well known for its vibrant and popular Little Saigon area along Victoria Street; however, the area is also recognised for the illicit drug dealing (especially heroin) that occurs in both street-based and domestic contexts.

The Richmond District in San Francisco (the area north of Golden Gate Park) was named after Richmond, Victoria, Australia. 
The designer of the Park's Japanese Tea Garden was from Melbourne and bought land in the yet-undeveloped area and named after the then posh suburb of his hometown.

Landmarks and built environment

Commercial and government
Richmond Trader’s Centre is a local shopping centre below an apartment block. The centre including a Coles Supermarket, DeMarias Grocer, Cannings Butcher, Gong Cha, Earl Canteen, Sushi & Nori and Cobb Lane. 

Cobb Lane is the local artisan bakery in Richmond trader’s centre with an extensive sourdough bread and viennoiserie range. 

Victoria Gardens Shopping Centre is a large modern complex built in 2001 to service the inner eastern suburbs. The Loyal Studley Hotel was built in 1891 and is now used as a homewares shop. Richmond Power Station was built in 1891. The Burnley Theatre is now a commercial homewares shop, but contains some elements of the original interiors, including the foyer and stage. 450 Swan Street, completed in 1995, combines an old bank and modern building in outstanding example of deconstructivist architecture, by Ashton Raggart McDougall. Richmond Town Hall is a landmark building currently operated by the City of Yarra, which was built in the 1880s and redecorated during the interwar years. Hotels include The Mountain View Hotel, Corner Hotel, The Spread Eagle Hotel, The Rising Sun and The Swan (1890) and many others known for their live music.

Housing
With a large number of small homes in its narrow streets, Richmond has some of Melbourne's best examples of residential architecture from most periods. The majority of houses in Richmond are the single fronted victorian style houses built from the 1850s to 1930s. Typically these houses are long thin blocks with two bedrooms at the front and family room/kitchen at the back. Traditionally the toilet or outhouse was situated at the back of the property outside.

Notable examples include The Malthouse, a landmark conversion of silos into apartments by award-winning architect Nonda Katsalidis.

The bluestone terrace homes at 13 & 15 James Street, built in 1857 in the rustic Gothic style for Eneas Mackenzie, a civil servant, are classified by the National Trust and are among the oldest homes remaining in Melbourne.

Lalor House on Church Street, named after and former home of Eureka Stockade upriser Peter Lalor, is a rich boom-style landmark.

Gallery

Industry
From the mid-19th century, Richmond was a centre of manufacturing industry, including many large complexes such as the Bryant & May match factory, Jaques Limited engineering works, the Wertheim Piano factory and Pelaco.

Public space
Richmond has a lot of public space to cater for its dense population. The largest park is Burnley Park. Other notable spaces include Citizens Park, bordering on Church and Highett Streets, Barkly Gardens and the Allen Bain Reserve, as well as a number of smaller parks and reserves.

Other large parks are located in nearby suburbs, including Yarra Park and Melbourne Park in East Melbourne (Jolimont), the Golden Square Bicentennial Park, Burnley Park and oval, the Burnley Golf Course (survey paddock) and a number of sport reserves and ovals in neighbouring Burnley. Pridmore Park, Yarra Bank Reserve, Creswick Street Reserve and St James Park are in Hawthorn, Dickinsons Reserve, Yarra Bend Park, Studley Park Golf Course and Studley Park are in Kew.

Demographics

At the 2016 census Richmond had a population of 27,705. The most common ancestries in Richmond were English 22.6%, Australian 15.8%, Irish 10.4%, Scottish 7.2% and Chinese 5.8%. 60.0% of people were born in Australia. The most common countries of birth were Vietnam 5.0%, England 3.7%, New Zealand 3.1%, China 2.0% and Greece 2.0%. 66.0% of people only spoke English at home. Other languages spoken at home included Vietnamese 6.6%, Greek 4.0%, Mandarin 2.4%, Cantonese 1.7% and Hakka 1.2%. The most common responses for religion were No Religion 44.2% and Catholic 18.3%.

Religion

Many religious groups exist in Richmond. The local large Catholic community is served by St Ignatius' Church on Church Street and St James Parish. Anglicans also have a presence in Richmond, served by St Stephens, next door to St Ignatius' Church. A Uniting Church also serves its members with a Fijian presence, located on Church Street.

Due to a large amount of Greek Immigration in Australia there is a Greek Orthodox Church, located on Burnley Street, which is open for mass every Sunday and brings together Richmond's Greek Community.

There is also a large Assemblies of God Church, Richmond AOG, in Griffiths Street.

Sport

Richmond is home to the Richmond Football Club, an Australian rules football club, which is a member of the Australian Football League. The club has a cult following not only in Richmond, but throughout the eastern suburbs of Melbourne. Richmond are one of the biggest clubs in the AFL, with over 105,000 members in 2022 and have won 13 premierships, the latest being 2020. 

The Tigers play the majority of their home games at the Melbourne Cricket Ground (MCG), which is just outside the suburb's border, and regularly attract crowds in excess of 50,000; however, can draw as large as 90,000 against fierce rivals. The team trains and runs their administration from their spiritual home ground, Punt Road Oval (adjacent to the MCG). Although the club have not played home games at the Punt Road Oval since the end of the 1964 season, the Richmond Football Club have rebuilt a new social club and training facility at the Punt Road Oval. The club have played their home games at the neighbouring Melbourne Cricket Ground (MCG) since 1965.

Richmond is home to Richmond Harriers Athletic Club, who compete in Athletics Victoria sanctioned competition in track and field, road running and cross-country running. The club was founded in 1913 and celebrated its centenary year in 2013. The club is located at Citizen's Park, at the corner of Highett Street and Gleadell Street.

Schools
 Melbourne Girls' College
 St Kevin's College (Waterford Campus)
 Richmond Primary School
 Richmond West Primary School
 Yarra Primary School
 Trinity Catholic Primary School
 Richmond High School

Transport

Richmond has an established transport system involving arterial roads, five train stations, seven tram routes, a bus route and a series of bicycle trails, including the Capital City Trail and the Yarra River Trail.

Richmond is served by tram numbers 12 and 109, on Victoria Street, tram number 78 on Church Street, tram numbers 48 and 75 on Bridge Road and tram number 70 on Swan Street.

The main train station in Richmond is Richmond railway station. It is an interchange for all metropolitan passenger trains to the eastern and south-eastern suburbs. Railway lines that travel through Richmond Station include the Pakenham, Cranbourne, Frankston, Lilydale, Belgrave, Glen Waverley, Sandringham and Alamein lines.

Other train stations in Richmond include North Richmond and West Richmond.

Health

Epworth Hospital (private) is a major surgical hospital. It has a major campus in Richmond fronting both Bridge Road and Erin Street.

The Melbourne Clinic (private) is a major psychiatric facility in Church Street.

Access Health and Community is a major primary health service at 283 Church Street and was founded in 1868 as the Richmond Dispensary, making it possibly the oldest continuously running GP practice and community health centre in Australia.  Sir Robert Menzies, a former Australian Prime Minister, on retiring from the Commonwealth Parliament was the head of the fund raising committee for the current building which was opened in 1978.

Richmond in popular culture
 The cult punk film Dogs in Space (1986) directed by Richard Lowenstein and starring Michael Hutchence was filmed in Richmond.
 Songwriter Paul Kelly's song 'Leaps and Bounds' mentions Richmond's 'clock on the silo', otherwise known as the Nylex Clock.
 Ron Barassi formerly owned The Mountain View Hotel.
 Renovation Challenge: The Block was filmed in four dilapidated houses on Cameron Street.

Notable people
 Dennis Allen
 Don Battye
 Peter Brock
 Roger Dean - Richmond Football Club premiership captain, born and raised in Richmond. 
 Megan Gale
 Bronwyn Halfpenny
 Marieke Hardy
 Stan Keon
 Norman Lacy
 Peter Lalor - Irish-born leader of the Eureka Rebellion, died in Richmond.
 Andy Lee
 Rove McManus
 Dame Nellie Melba – Was born in Richmond in 1861.
 Molly Meldrum
 David Mitchell
 Darcy Moore
 Van Tuong Nguyen
 Frank Scully
 Billy Slater
 Squizzy Taylor

See also
 City of Richmond – Richmond was previously within this former local government area.

References

External links
 

Suburbs of Melbourne
Suburbs of the City of Yarra